The Bengal danio or Sind danio (Devario devario) is a subtropical fish belonging to the minnow family (Cyprinidae). Originating in Pakistan, India, Nepal, Bangladesh, and Afghanistan, this fish is sometimes kept in community tanks by fish-keeping hobbyists.

Their diets consist of annelid worms, small crustaceans, and insects. The Bengal danio is oviparous.

See also
 List of freshwater aquarium fish species

References

External links
 Devario devario
Clarke, Matt (2005) – A fishkeeper's guide to danios and devarios
 Devario devario distribution map

Devario
Fish of Bangladesh
Fish of Pakistan
Fish described in 1822
Taxa named by Francis Buchanan-Hamilton